Orunamamu (4 April 1921 4 September 2014) was an American/Canadian professional storyteller, raconteur and griot. Her peripatetic storytelling led her on extensive, demanding and often impromptu journeys across the United States including Alaska, overseas to the United Kingdom and Egypt and finally to Canada. She is included in a number of books, journals, articles and two documentaries. Her performance medium was the spoken voice in performances to audiences. For Orunamamu storytelling became her cause as well as her art form, because "[s]torytelling demonstrates the humanity in every culture." Orunamamu died in Calgary, Alberta on 4 September 2014 at the age of 93. She was booked to perform at the Calgary Spoken Word Festival in the summer of 2014. Orunamamu has been the subject of countless portraits over many decades and in many countries, including photographers such as Arthur Koch (Oakland), Kenneth Locke (Calgary) and Jim Hair. Many of these are shared through social media.

Early years 
Marybeth Washington worked as a teacher for thirty years, starting in Wisconsin, then Palo Alto and Utah, and finally in Berkeley. Writer Carolyn North described how Washington was her own children's favourite teacher when they were in kindergarten. Even then she was a colourful character who broke the rules by taking the children out walking in the rain, dressing up like a circus performer and even taking a nap during the students' nap time. Although the school board attempted to fire her a number of times, parents like North would defend her and it took the school board many years to succeed.

Full-time storyteller 
Following her retirement in the 1970s as Master School Teacher in the Berkeley school district, Orunamamu started storytelling full-time, following in the footsteps of her grandmother and father. Although Orunamamu traveled a lot, often by train, to storytelling festivals and venues wherever she was she would set up a mobile storytelling museum. Often surrounded by her paraphernalia and freshly renewed outrageous attire including her "hat-i-tude," her walking sticks, she would often initiate her storytelling with the line, "If you see a feather ..."

In his 2002 publication entitled Coincidence Or Destiny? Stories of Synchronicity That Illuminate Our Lives  award-winning writer and filmmaker Phil Cousineau described his chance encounter with Orunamamu,

Over the last two decades she traveled regularly between her two sons' homes in Oakland and Calgary on the Amtrak. Their private porches became public storytelling museums spaces, a refuge for her "abundant supply of storytelling paraphernalia" particularly in Oakland, California where her son painted the porch steps purple.

For two years Pacific Grove filmmaker Greg Young documented the intertwined lives of Orunamamu, her family and friends in her home in Oakland, to produce his 2003 documentary "Do you know yellowlegs is a storytelling museum?" about aging and independence. As Young worked on the film he and many others worked towards organizing her Oakland residence with her storytelling paraphernalia into a storytelling museum. The title of the film refers to her yellow leggings. The film was shown at the 2003 Berkeley Art Center Film Festival, Berkeley, California  and at the 2004 Real To Reel Film Festival, Kings Mountain, North Carolina.

By 2004 she was already described as "Rockridge's very own world-class storyteller" in an article in The Rockridge News When Oakland writer Niesar met her she was wearing a "green velvet chapeau, quilted jacket, yellow stockings her trademark, necklaces and bangles, numerous bags and a sturdy walking stick, the mark of the griot." Neisar described her home in Oakland as,

Artists and aging 
Orunamamu was interviewed by Amy Gorman as part of a Project Arts & Longevity in the San Francisco Bay area. Gorman, in her investigation of a potential link between longevity and artistic vitality, collected the life stories of women between the ages of 85 and 105 who continued to be actively engaged in their artistic profession full-time. The resulting publication Aging Artfully featured Orunamamu on the cover.

The film Still Kicking resulted from collaborative project between Amy Gorman, Frances Kandl and Greg Young who met through Orunamamu.

Calgary Spoken Word Festival 
Orunamamu has been part of the Calgary Spoken Word Festival since it was founded in 2003 by Sheri-D Wilson "for the dissemination and promotion of Spoken Word Poetry locally, provincially, nationally and internationally, through performance and education." Performing artists at the annual festival have included some of Canada's finest such as George Elliott Clarke , Lillian Allen, Ivan Coyote, Lorna Crozier and Diane di Prima.

References

 
 
 Foreword by Robert A. Johnson.
 
 

 
 
 
 

 
 

1921 births
2014 deaths
20th-century African-American women
20th-century African-American people
American storytellers
Women storytellers
Storytellers
Artists from Oakland, California
American emigrants to Canada
Canadian spoken word artists
Canadian storytellers